Believe is the sixth studio album by Canadian country music group Emerson Drive. The album was released in Canada on May 5, 2009 via Midas/Valory/Open Road. The album's first single, "Belongs to You," reached the top forty on the Billboard Hot Country Songs chart in the United States.

Critical reception

The album received mixed reviews from music critics. It received a three-and-a-half star rating from Todd Sterling of AllMusic, who said that the album was "slickly produced" and that it "sticks to the well-worn formula of the group's previous releases," but said that it had "every color of the musical rainbow." Sterling cited "Your Last" as a standout, calling it a "lump-in-the-throat masterpiece." Jim Malec of The 9513 gave it one star out of five, referring to the song's lyrics as largely cliché in nature and saying, "There is not a single song on Believe worth hearing. It is an entirely disposable album that is unoriginal, uninteresting and unnecessary." Malec also criticized the album's sound, saying that the mixing of instruments and Brad Mates' vocals did not seem cohesive.

Track listing

Chart performance

Singles

Release history

References

2009 albums
Emerson Drive albums
Albums produced by Josh Leo
Midas Records Nashville albums
Big Machine Records albums